Terry Boyd (born October 31, 1969) is an American former basketball player. He played for Western Carolina University from 1990–91 to 1991–92 and was the Southern Conference co-Player of the Year as a senior. That year, he led the Catamounts in scoring 22.8 points per game) and rebounding (5.8 per game). Boyd was also a two-time All-SoCon tournament Team in 1991 and 1992. Prior to Western Carolina, Boyd spent two seasons playing at Southern Union State Community College in Wadley, Alabama. Through 2012–13, Boyd still holds the Western Carolina record for three-pointers made per game in a season (3.35). His 23.32 points per game career average is third all-time in school history.

Although he went undrafted in the 1992 NBA Draft following his collegiate career, Boyd did play professionally. He spent some time playing in Venezuela.  He also played briefly in the Continental Basketball Association, averaging 7.7 points in nine games with the Wichita Falls Texans during the 1992–93 season.

References

1969 births
Living people
American expatriate basketball people in Venezuela
American men's basketball players
Basketball players from Georgia (U.S. state)
Guards (basketball)
People from Carrollton, Georgia
Southern Union State Bison men's basketball players
Sportspeople from the Atlanta metropolitan area
Western Carolina Catamounts men's basketball players
Wichita Falls Texans players